Legna Hernández (born  in Camuy, Puerto Rico) is a Puerto Rican female volleyball player. She is part of the Puerto Rico women's national volleyball team.

Career
She participated in the 2014 FIVB Volleyball World Grand Prix. On club level she played for Leonas de Ponce in 2014.

Hernández played the 2018 Arab Women Sports Tournament with the club from Bahrain Al Muharraq.

References

External links
 FIVB Profile

1991 births
Living people
People from Camuy, Puerto Rico
Puerto Rican women's volleyball players
Wing spikers